Fabiana Cristine da Silva (born 3 September 1978) is a Brazilian female former distance runner who competed in the 800 metres up to the half marathon. She competed six times at the IAAF World Cross Country Championships (five times as a junior) and also represented her country at the 2010 IAAF World Half Marathon Championships and the 2011 Pan American Games.

She was the gold medallist in the 5000 m at the 2011 South American Championships in Athletics and set a championship record of 15:39.67 minutes in the process. She had won the 1500 m silver earlier in her career at the 1999 South American Championships in Athletics. She was twice a 5000 m silver medallist at the Ibero-American Championships in Athletics (2008, 2012). She was also the regional champion at the 2000 South American Cross Country Championships, winning the women's short race. She had been junior champion at that event in 1994 and 1997.

Born in Recife, she set Brazilian junior records in the 1500 metres, 3000 metres and 5000 metres in the late 1990s. She competed for the BM&F Bovespa team. Silva was among the most promising South American junior athletes of her generation. She won a 1500/3000 m double at both the 1996 South American Junior Championships in Athletics and 1997 Pan American Junior Athletics Championships. She won three distance running medals from 800 m to 3000 m at the 1994 South American Youth Championships in Athletics.

Personal bests
800 metres – 2:04.24 min (2000)
1500 metres – 4:12.67 min (2000)
3000 metres – 9:10.97 min (2006)
5000 metres – 15:39.67 min (2011)
10,000 metres – 33:26.33 min (2008)
10K run – 33:25 min (2002)
Half marathon – 75:10 min (2010)

International competitions

National titles
Brazilian Athletics Championships
1500 metres: 1997, 2000, 2001, 2002
5000 metres: 1997, 1999, 2000, 2001, 2002, 2004, 2005

References

External links

Living people
1978 births
Sportspeople from Recife
Brazilian female middle-distance runners
Brazilian female long-distance runners
Pan American Games athletes for Brazil
Athletes (track and field) at the 2011 Pan American Games
20th-century Brazilian women
21st-century Brazilian women